Sofía Osío Luna (born 27 May 2000) is a Colombian model, social communicator and beauty queen crowned Señorita Colombia 2022. She will represent Colombia at the Miss International 2023 competition.

Early life 
Sofía was born in Barranquilla, Colombia. She is the daughter of Fernán Manrique and Susana Luna, and has three siblings. She studied high school at the Colegio Hebreo Unión (Union Hebrew School) a bilingual institution located in her city of origin, while her subsequent academic training took place at the Istituto Europeo di Design, located in Barcelona, Spain, where she graduated as a professional in fashion marketing and communication. In addition to her native language, she is fluent in English. From a young age, she has served as a model for different brands nationwide.

Pageantry

Señorita Atlántico 2022 
Sofía Osío's career in beauty pageants began in June 2022, when she was decreed as the new Señorita Atlántico for the next edition of Miss Colombia pageant (Concurso Nacional de Belleza), that would be carried out during the month of November of the same year.

Señorita Colombia 2022 
In the competition, she stood out as one of the favorite candidates to obtain the title of Señorita Colombia, which Valentina Espinosa held at that time. Her performance during the course of the contest allowed her to become the winner on the night of November 13, 2022 in the city of Cartagena as is customary in tradition of the beauty pageant.

Her victory gave its department the title number 12 in the history of the Miss Colombia pageant, a distinction that the department hadn't obtained since Paulina Vega in 2013.

Miss International 2023 
She will represent Colombia at Miss International 2023.

References

External links

Colombian female models
2000 births
Living people
People from Barranquilla
Colombian beauty pageant winners